The following is a timeline of the history of the city of Bujumbura, Burundi.

Prior to 20th century
 1885 - Mohamed Bin Khalfan in power in region.
 1899 - Germans establish military settlement at village of Usumbura in colonial German East Africa.

20th century

 1912 - Usumbura becomes capital of Ruanda-Urundi.
 1916 - Belgians in power in Ruanda-Urundi.
 1928 - Buyenzi neighborhood created.
 1932 - Kabondo neighborhood created.
 1941 - Kabondo neighborhood razed due to poor public health.
 1945 - Kamenge and Kinama neighborhoods created.
 1952 - Bujumbura Airport opens.
 1955 - Holy Spirit Lycée (school) active.
 1959 - Roman Catholic diocese of Usumbura established.
 1960
 University of Burundi founded.
 Radio nationale begins broadcasting.
 1962
 City becomes national capital of newly formed Burundi; Usumbura renamed "Bujumbura."
 Gérard Kibinakanwa becomes mayor.
 1963
  neighborhood created.
 Maniema FC (football club) formed.
 1965 - École Belge de Bujumbura (school) opens.
 1970 - Population: 78,810 (urban agglomeration).
 1978 - Renouveau du Burundi government newspaper begins publication.
 1984 - Télévision nationale begins broadcasting.
 1990 - Population: 235,440.
 1991 - Kamenge Youth Centre established.
 1995
 Ethnic violence during the Burundian Civil War.
 11 March: Government official Ernest Kabushemeye killed.
 1996
  begins broadcasting.
 1998 - Civilians killed by Hutu rebels at airport.
 2000
 13 October: Army-rebel (Tutsi-Hutu) conflict occurs near city.
 31 December: Civilians killed by Hutu rebels near city.

21st century

 2003
 City besieged by rebel forces.
 April: Peacekeeping African Union Mission in Burundi headquartered in city.
Each has its own council and leader.
 2007 - September: Conflict between factions of the National Forces of Liberation.
 2008 - Population: 497,169.
 2011 - 30 November: East African Community summit held in city.
 2012
 March: Labor strike.
 Saidi Juma becomes mayor.
 2013 - Central market burns down.
 2015 - Burundian unrest (2015–present).
 2018 December 24 - Burundi moved its capital from Bujumbura to Gitega.

See also
 Bujumbura history (fr)
 List of mayors of Bujumbura
 Timeline of Burundian history

References

This article incorporates information from the French Wikipedia and Spanish Wikipedia.

Bibliography

in English
 
 
 
 
 

in French
 Sylvestre Ndayirukiye, Bujumbura centenaire : 1897-1997 : croissance et défis, L'Harmattan, Paris, 2002, 375 p.  
 
 
  

in German

External links

  (Images, etc.)
  (Images, etc.)
  (Bibliography)
  (Bibliography)
  (Bibliography)
 

Bujumbura
Bujumbura
Bujumbura
Years in Burundi
Bujumbura